David Malinowski is a BAFTA and Oscar winning special effects make-up artist. He started his career in 1996 and spent 10 years working for Madame Tussauds in London, then left to pursue his career in film and television. At the 2018 BAFTA Film Awards he won the award for Film Makeup and Hair, and at the 90th Academy Awards, he won the award for Best Makeup and Hairstyling for his work on the 2017 film Darkest Hour. He was nominated with Kazuhiro Tsuji and Lucy Sibbick. He lives in the Buckinghamshire village of Aston Clinton.

Early life
Malinowski attended New College, Stamford until 1996.

Career
His first credit role was an episode of ITV show London's Burning, filmed in 1997.

Filmography
 Wonder Woman 1984
 Bohemian Rhapsody
 Fantastic Beasts: The Crimes of Grindelwald
 Overlord
 Ready Player One
 Breathe
 Darkest Hour
 The Hitman's Bodyguard
 Fantastic Beasts and Where to Find Them
 Baar Baar Dekho
 Now You See Me 2
 Zoolander 2
 The Revenant
 Victor Frankenstein
 Dracula Untold
 The Grand Budapest Hotel
 Hansel & Gretel: Witch Hunters
 Wrath of the Titans
 Emergency

References

External links
 
 

Living people
Best Makeup Academy Award winners
Best Makeup BAFTA Award winners
Special effects people
Year of birth missing (living people)